The foreign relations of Venezuela had since the early twentieth century been particularly strong with the United States. However, since the election of Hugo Chávez as President of Venezuela in 1998, Venezuela's foreign policy differed substantially from that of previous Venezuelan governments. This change in foreign policy direction continues under the current president Nicolás Maduro.

From 2019 to 2023, Juan Guaidó held a disputed claim as president of Venezuela after the possibly fraudulent 2018 election. In general, western-allied nations such as the United States recognized Guaidó while non-western allied nations recognized the Maduro government.

Bilateral relations

Africa

Americas

Asia

Europe

Oceania

Multilateral organizations

Organisation of American States 
By virtue of its geographical location, Venezuela became one of the members of the Organisation of American States (OAS) on "April 30, 1948" when they signed the "CHARTER OF THE ORGANIZATION OF AMERICAN STATES (A-41)". On 21 December 1951, the treaty was ratified by Venezuela "IN ACCORDANCE WITH ARTICLE 145 OF THE CHARTER".

In looking at the treaty, one would note that there are three parts with twenty-two chapters in total to the Treaty of the OAS. According to the OAS website. "Chapter XXI RATIFICATION AND ENTRY INTO FORCE, Article 141" the OAS Treaty or Charter "shall be registered with the Secretariat of the United Nations through the General Secretariat"

In accordance with "Chapter XIII THE INTER-AMERICAN COUNCIL FOR INTEGRAL DEVELOPMENT- Article 94 – The purpose of the Inter-American Council for Integral Development is to promote cooperation among the American States for the purpose of achieving integral development and, in particular, helping to eliminate extreme poverty, in accordance with the standards of the Charter, especially those set forth in Chapter VII with respect to the economic, social, educational, cultural, scientific, and technological fields." To a large extent over the years, the people of Trinidad and Tobago have benefited from the generosity of the Venezuelans, whether it was due to their innate ability to give and share or whether it was provided by the articles of the Treaty as a means to share and for that they are grateful.

On 26 April 2017, Venezuela announced its intention to withdraw from the OAS. Venezuelan Foreign Minister Delcy Rodríguez said that President Nicolás Maduro plans to publicly renounce Venezuela's membership on 27 April 2017. It will take two years for the country to formally leave. During this period, the country does not plan on participating in the OAS.

Summits of the Americas
"The Summits of the Americas are institutionalized gatherings of the heads of state and government of the Western Hemisphere where leaders discuss common policy issues, affirm shared values and commit to concerted actions at the national and regional level to address continuing and new challenges faced in the Americas. To date there have been seven Summits of the Americas. There have also been at least two Special Meetings which were held between 1996 and 2004.

"At the Third Summit," which was held in Quebec, Canada in 2001 "leaders instructed their foreign ministers to prepare an Inter-American Democratic Charter which was adopted on September 11, 2001 in Lima".

The Fifth Summit of the Americas was held in Port of Spain, Trinidad and Tobago in 2009 was attended by Hugo Chávez on behalf of Venezuela. Also in attendance were Prime Minister Patrick Manning of Trinidad and Tobago and President Barack Obama of the United States of America.

The Seventh Summit of the Americas was held in Panama City, Panama on 10–11 April 2015.

Peru will host the Eighth Summit of the Americas in 2018.

Indigenous Leaders Summits of Americas (ILSA)
With Venezuela having tribes of indigenous persons, given the geographical location of the country, recent developments in the oil and gas sector internationally and offshore, (such as Eliza I and II, the developments offshore of Suriname) the contributions of the Venezuelans to the OAS with respect to this area, that is, indigenous people may be significant going forward.

The position of the OAS with respect to indigenous persons appears to be developing over the years. The following statements appear to capture the position of  the OAS with respect to the ILSA :"The "OAS has supported and participated in the organisation of Indigenous Leaders Summits of Americas (ILSA)" according to the OAS's website. The most recent "statement made by the Heads of State of the hemisphere was in the Declaration of Commitments of Port of Spain  in 2009 – Paragraph 86" according to the OAS's website."

The Draft American Declaration of the Rights of the Indigenous Persons appears to be a working document. The last "Meeting for Negotiations in the Quest for Consensus on this area appeared to be Meeting Number (18) eighteen and is listed as being held in May 2015 according to the website.

Betancourt Doctrine

The Betancourt Doctrine, named after one of the first presidents of Venezuela's democratic era, Rómulo Betancourt "whereby Venezuela refused to maintain diplomatic relations with governments formed as a result of military coups, was adhered to by both administrations (first two presidents of Venezuela's democratic era). Although the doctrine was much praised, it gradually isolated Venezuela as most other Latin American nations became dominated by nonelected regimes."

Other international organisations to which Venezuela belongs
"In the democratic era, Venezuela has attempted to fulfill the principles of Simon Bolivar's ideals through a variety of means. It maintained active membership in the United Nations (UN) and its related agencies, other than this; the Organization of the Petroleum Exporting Countries (OPEC), the Organization of American States (OAS) and its related entities, and a host of other world and hemispheric organizations. In all these forums, Venezuela consistently aligned itself with other democracies"
Venezuela and the United States belong to a number of the same international organizations, including the related agencies of the UN such as the International Monetary Fund, World Bank, and World Trade Organization.

In October 2019, Venezuela competed for one of the two seats to the United Nations Human Rights Council, along with Brazil and Costa Rica, and was elected with 105 votes in a secret ballot by the 193-member United Nations General Assembly. Brazil was re-elected with 153 votes, while Costa Rica was not having garnered 96 votes and entering the month of the election as competition to Venezuela. The United States, Lima Group and human rights groups lobbied against Venezuela's election.

When the UN General Assembly voted to add Venezuela to the UN Human Rights Council in October 2019, US Ambassador to the UN Kelly Craft wrote: "I am personally aggrieved that 105 countries voted in favor of this affront to human life and dignity. It provides ironclad proof that the Human Rights Council is broken, and reinforces why the United States withdrew." Venezuela had been accused of withholding from the Venezuelan people humanitarian aid delivered from other nations, and of manipulating its voters in exchange for food and medical care. The council had been criticized regularly for admitting members who were themselves suspected of human rights violations.

International disputes

Border dispute 
Venezuela claims most of Guyana west of the Essequibo River, in a dispute which dates back to the early nineteenth century and which saw the Venezuela Crisis of 1895. It also has a maritime boundary dispute with Colombia in the Gulf of Venezuela. The country also has an active maritime boundary dispute with Dominica over the Isla Aves archipelago located in the Caribbean.

See also
 Foreign policy of the Hugo Chávez government
 List of diplomatic missions in Venezuela
 List of diplomatic missions of Venezuela
 Maletinazo

Notes